The following lists events that happened during 1986 in the Somali Democratic Republic.

Incumbents 
 President: Siad Barre

Events 
Ongoing – Somali Rebellion

January 
 January – President Barre and the Ethiopian presidentMengistu Haile Mariam meet in Djibouti to normalise relations between the two countries.

May 
 May 23 – President Barre is suffers life-threatening injuries in an automobile collision near Mogadishu, when the car that was transporting him smashed into the back of a bus during a heavy rainstorm. He was treated in a hospital in Saudi Arabia for head injuries, broken ribs and shock over a period of a month.

December 
 December 23 – The Somali Presidential Elections take place, reelecting Siad Barre for another term.

See also 

 Somali Rebellion

References 

 
1980s in Somalia
Years of the 20th century in Somalia
Somalia
Somalia